In mathematics, the Hutchinson metric otherwise known as Kantorovich metric is a function which measures "the discrepancy between two images for use in fractal image processing" and "can also be applied to describe the similarity between DNA sequences expressed as real or complex genomic signals".

Formal definition
Consider only nonempty, compact, and finite metric spaces.

the embedding associating to  the point measure .

If   is Borel measurable then the induced map

associates to  the measure  defined by

Then the Hutchinson metric is given by

Then  is an isometric embedding of  into , and if  is Lipschitz then  is Lipschitz with the same Lipschitz constant.

See also
Wasserstein metric
Acoustic metric
Apophysis (software)
Complete metric
Fractal image compression
Image differencing
Metric tensor
Multifractal system

Sources and notes

Metric geometry
Topology